"The Legend of Xanadu" is a single by Dave Dee, Dozy, Beaky, Mick & Tich that reached number one in the UK Singles Chart in 1968 and was the group's biggest hit. It was written by songwriters Ken Howard and Alan Blaikley. As was the case with many of the group's recordings, it features novelty elements — a trumpet section and the distinctive sound of a whip cracking in the chorus. The musical accompaniment was directed by John Gregory. The single was certified gold in November 1968.

Reception
Reviewing for Disc and Music Echo, Penny Valentine wrote: "Having taken us on a round tour of Israel, Russia and goodness knows where else the gentlemen are now thundering across the prairies with this sort of Marty Robbins/Elmer Bernstein piece, Alpert trumpets, whiplash and all!" She also described the song as "very spirited, a lot better than they've done for a long time".

Track listing
7"
"The Legend of Xanadu" (Ken Howard, Alan Blaikley) – 3:35
"Please" (Dave Harman, John Dymond, Trevor Davies) – 3:20

Charts

Cover versions
 In 1968, Japanese band the Jaguars released a cover of the song as a single, which peaked at number 20 on the Oricon Singles Chart.
 In 1968, Spanish band Los Mustang released a Spanish-language version, titled "La leyenda de Xanadú", which peaked at number 18 on the Spanish Singles Chart.
 In 1992, the song was covered by English band the Fall for the NME various artists compilation album Ruby Trax.

References in popular culture
 In Red Dwarf episode "Timeslides" (Season 3, Episode 5), an alternative dimension sees Dave Lister rich and living in a mansion named Xanadu; "not as a reference to the film Citizen Kane, but rather as a tribute to the hit single by Dave Dee, Dozy, Beaky, Mick and Tich".

See also
Xanadu

References

1968 singles
UK Singles Chart number-one singles
Irish Singles Chart number-one singles
Number-one singles in Israel
Number-one singles in New Zealand
Number-one singles in Zimbabwe
Songs written by Ken Howard (composer)
Songs written by Alan Blaikley
1968 songs
Imperial Records singles
Fontana Records singles
Song recordings produced by Steve Rowland